Jacob Neff may refer to:

 Jacob H. Neff (1830–1909), American politician, Lieutenant Governor of California
 Jacob G. Neff (1840–1925), American politician in the Virginia House of Delegates